W. B. Keckler, (born 1966 Harrisburg, Pennsylvania), is an American poet and translator.

Poetry
Keckler's poetry characteristically views nature as autonomous from the humanly-constructed world and attempts to chart the rhythms of this autonomy. Recent collections have seen the introduction of works produced in collaboration with artificial intelligence entities and conversations with artificial intelligence entities.

Keckler's poetry has appeared in numerous anthologies, including Isn't It Romantic: 100 Love Poems by Younger American Poets (Wave Books, NYC), In the Criminal's Cabinet (nth position, London) and poem, home: An Ars Poetica (Paper Kite Press, 2009).

Awards
 2002 National Poetry Series, for Sanskrit of the Body
 1994-1995 Gertrude Stein Award in Innovative American Poetry, for "One Poem"
 1997 Fellowship in Poetry from the National Endowment on the Arts

Works
 "Snow Wok", Shampoo 17
 "Spring Poem," Coconut 14
 "Two Poems," Free Verse
 "Holding Holding" and other poems, Gut Cult
 Sanskrit of the Body (2002), 
 Ants Dissolve in Moonlight (1995)

Translations
  - André Malraux's early works Royaume-Farfelu and Lunes en Papier

Blog
Keckler is a prolific poet and new works can be found daily at his blog.

External links
 W.B. Keckler on Scribd
 Joe Brainard's Pyjamas blog

American male poets
Living people
1966 births
20th-century American poets
21st-century American poets
20th-century American translators
21st-century American translators
Writers from Harrisburg, Pennsylvania
Poets from Pennsylvania
20th-century American male writers
21st-century American male writers